Carol Black (born c. 1957/1958) is an American writer and filmmaker. She is known as the creator and writer-producer of the television series The Wonder Years and Ellen, both with her husband and writing partner Neal Marlens. Black and Marlens received the 1988 Emmy Award for Outstanding Comedy Series for The Wonder Years and the 1989 Writers Guild of America award after the first six-episode season had aired.

Black studied education and literature at Swarthmore College and UCLA, and after the birth of her children, left her career in the entertainment industry to become involved in the unschooling and alternative education movement and later to make independent nonprofit films.

In 2010, she directed the documentary film Schooling the World: The White Man’s Last Burden about the impacts of institutional schooling on small-scale land-based societies. Schooling the World premiered at the Vancouver International Film Festival, and features Wade Davis, Helena Norberg-Hodge, Vandana Shiva, Manish Jain, and Dolma Tsering. She also co-directed with Marlens the 2005 mockumentary The Lost People of Mountain Village, about excessive real estate development in the Rocky Mountains, which premiered at Mountainfilm in Telluride.

References

External links
Official website: carolblack.org

Screenwriters from Maryland
American television producers
American television writers
American women screenwriters
Living people
Place of birth missing (living people)
Showrunners
Swarthmore College alumni
University of California, Los Angeles alumni
Writers Guild of America Award winners
American women television producers
American women television writers
1958 births
21st-century American women